This is a list of notable people hailing from the city of Istanbul.

 Hrant Dink editor of an Armenian newspaper
 Halide Edib Adıvar, novelist, politician
 Müjde Ar, actress
 Oğuz Aral, cartoonist
 Bülent Arel, music producer
 Duygu Asena, women's rights activist
 Hulusi Behçet, dermatologist
 Semiha Berksoy, opera singer
 Orhan Boran, radio and TV host
 Aydın Boysan, architect, academic, author and essayist
 Yaşar Büyükanıt, Chief of the Turkish General Staff
 Eylül Cansın, transgender sex worker
 Cornelius Castoriadis, Greek-French political philosopher
 Hakan Celik, journalist, TV anchorman, radio producer
 Hande Berktan, journalist, TV presenter
 Nuri Bilge Ceylan, filmmaker
 Manuel Chrysoloras, Greek academic, diplomat
 Tansu Çiller, former prime minister
 Volkan Diyaroğlu, artist
 Bülent Ecevit, former prime minister
 Neşe Erberk, Miss Europe 1984
 Recep Tayyip Erdoğan, President of Turkey
 Sertab Erener, singer 
 Ahmet Ertegün, co-founder and executive of Atlantic Records and the New York Cosmos
 Nesuhi Ertegün, co-founder and executive of Atlantic Records and the New York Cosmos
 Yonca Evcimik, pop singer
 Shlomo Gazit (born 1926), Israeli head of IDF military intelligence, President of Ben-Gurion University 
 Leyla Gencer, opera singer
 Fatma Girik, actress
 Münir Göle, writer and photographer
Ali Ferit Gören (1913-1987), Austrian-Turkish Olympic sprinter
 Gregory V, Greek Patriarch of Constantinople
 Ara Güler, photographer
 Tunç Hamarat, correspondence chess world champion 2004
 Tunch Ilkin, former American football player, TV anchor
 Ertuğrul Işınbark, stage magician
 Nihat Kahveci, football player
 İrem Karamete (born 1993), Olympic fencer
 Elia Kazan, director, producer, screenwriter, novelist, actor
 Hülya Koçyiğit, actress
 Fahri Korutürk, former president of Turkey
 Lefter Küçükandonyadis, football player
 Mike Lazaridis, founder of Research in Motion
 Nasuh Mahruki, first Turkish person to summit Mt. Everest
 Barış Manço, musician
 Andrew Mango, British author
 Arif Mardin, music producer
 Kleanthis Maropoulos, Greek footballer
 Alexander Mavrocordatos, Greek dragoman to Sultan Mehmed IV
 Iskouhi Minas (1884–1951), French poet and novelist of Armenian descent, born in Istanbul
 Leone Minassian (1905–1978), Italian painter of Armenian descent, born in Istanbul
 Kostas Negrepontis, Greek footballer
 Aziz Nesin, novelist
 Marika Nezer, Greek singer
 Altay Öktem, Turkish poet, writer, researcher and doctor
 Irfan Orga, Turkish Air Force fighter pilot, diplomat, writer
 Leon Walerian Ostroróg, jurist of Polish descent, adviser to the Ottoman government
 Orhan Pamuk, novelist
 Sadettin Pasha, Ottoman pasha
 Pekinel sisters, twin pianists
 Ajda Pekkan, singer
 Athinodoros Prousalis, Greek actor
 Nicola Rossi-Lemeni, opera singer
 Alexandros Soutsos, Greek poet and partisan
 Haldun Taner, playwright
 Hidayet Türkoğlu, basketball player
Antonietta Gambara Untersteiner, composer
 Orhan Veli, poet
 Stavros Xenidis, Greek actor
 Hamza Yerlikaya, wrestler and Olympic gold medalist
 Erol Yesilkaya, Turkish-German screenwriter 
 Cem Yılmaz, stand-up comedian, actor
 Gönül Engin Yılmaz, artist
 Alexander Ypsilantis (senior), Greek diplomat
 Alexander Ypsilantis (junior), Greek military commander
 Constantine Ypsilantis, Greek revolutionary

Related lists
List of people from Constantinople (between the 3rd century and 1453 CE)
Notable people from Byzantium (before the 3rd century CE)
List of museums and monuments in Istanbul
List of urban centers in Istanbul
List of universities in Istanbul
List of schools in Istanbul
List of architectural structures in Istanbul
List of columns and towers in Istanbul
List of libraries in Istanbul
List of mayors of Istanbul

 
Istanbul
Istanbul-related lists